Columbia River Collection, originally released as the Columbia River Ballads, is a compilation album of songs folksinger Woody Guthrie wrote during his visit to the U.S. states of Oregon and Washington in 1941.  Guthrie traveled to these states on the promise of a part narrating a documentary about the construction of public works dams and other projects in the Pacific Northwest. The documentary never came to fruition, but 17 of the 26 songs he wrote during this period were compiled and released as this collection, including some of his most famous songs, such as "Roll on Columbia", "Grand Coulee Dam",  "Hard Travelin’," and "Pastures of Plenty."

Production

In May 1941, after a brief stay in Los Angeles, Guthrie moved to Portland, Oregon, in the neighborhood of Lents, on the promise of a job. Gunther von Fritsch was directing a documentary about the Bonneville Power Administration's construction of the Grand Coulee Dam on the Columbia River, and needed a narrator. Alan Lomax had recommended Guthrie to narrate the film and sing songs onscreen. The original project was expected to take 12 months, but as the filmmakers became worried about casting such a political figure, they minimized Guthrie's role. The United States Department of the Interior hired him for one month to write songs about the Columbia River and the construction of the federal dams for the documentary's soundtrack.  Guthrie toured the Columbia River and the Pacific Northwest. Guthrie said he "couldn't believe it, it's a paradise", which appeared to inspire him creatively. In one month Guthrie wrote 26 songs, including three of his most famous: "Roll On, Columbia, Roll On", "Pastures of Plenty", and "Grand Coulee Dam". The surviving songs were released as Columbia River Songs. The film Columbia was not completed until 1949.

Track listing 
 "Oregon Trail"
 "Roll on Columbia"
 "New Found Land"
 "Talking Columbia"
 "Roll Columbia, Roll"
 "Columbia’s Waters"
 "Ramblin’ Blues"
 "It Takes a Married Man to Sing a Worried Song"
 "Hard Travelin’"
 "The Biggest Thing That Man Has Ever Done"
 "Jackhammer Blues"
 "Song of the Coulee Dam"
 "Grand Coulee Dam"
 "Washington Talkin’ Blues"
 "Ramblin’ Round"
 "Pastures of Plenty"
 "End of My Line"

See also 

 Woody Guthrie in the Pacific Northwest
 Bonneville Power Administration
 Woody Guthrie discography

Sources 
Track Listing of the Album from Woodyguthrie.org Woody Guthrie.org Retrieved on April 24, 2008

References 

Woody Guthrie albums
New Deal in Oregon
1988 compilation albums
Articles containing video clips